Myriapods are the members of subphylum Myriapoda, containing arthropods such as millipedes and centipedes. The group contains about 13,000 species, all of them terrestrial.

The fossil record of myriapods reaches back into the late Silurian, although molecular evidence suggests a diversification in the Cambrian Period, and Cambrian fossils exist which resemble myriapods.  The oldest unequivocal myriapod fossil is of the millipede Pneumodesmus newmani, from the late Silurian (428 million years ago).  P. newmani is also important as the earliest known terrestrial animal.   The phylogenetic classification of myriapods is still debated.

The scientific study of myriapods is myriapodology, and those who study myriapods are myriapodologists.

Anatomy

Myriapods have a single pair of antennae and, in most cases, simple eyes. Exceptions are the two classes symphylans and pauropods, and the millipede order Polydesmida and the centipede order Geophilomorpha, which are all eyeless. The house centipedes (Scutigera) on the other hand, have large and well-developed compound eyes. The mouthparts lie on the underside of the head, with an "epistome" and labrum forming the upper lip, and a pair of maxillae forming the lower lip. A pair of mandibles lie inside the mouth. Myriapods breathe through spiracles that connect to a tracheal system similar to that of insects. There is a long tubular heart that extends through much of the body, but usually few, if any, blood vessels.

Malpighian tubules excrete nitrogenous waste into the digestive system, which typically consists of a simple tube. Although the ventral nerve cord has a ganglion in each segment, the brain is relatively poorly developed.

During mating, male myriapods produce a packet of sperm, or spermatophore, which they must transfer to the female externally; this process is often complex and highly developed. The female lays eggs which hatch as much-shortened versions of the adults, with only a few segments and as few as three pairs of legs. With the exception of the two centipede orders Scolopendromorpha and Geophilomorpha, which have epimorphic development (all body segments are formed segments embryonically), the young add additional segments and limbs as they repeatedly moult to reach the adult form.

The process of adding new segments during postembryonic growth is known as anamorphosis, of which there are three types: euanamorphosis, emianamorphosis, and teloanamorphosis. In euanamorphosis, every moult is followed by addition of new segments, even after reaching sexual maturity; in emianamorphosis, new segments are added until a certain stage, and further moults happen without addition of segments; and in teloanamorphosis, where the addition of new segments stops after the adult form is reached, after no further moults occur.

Ecology
Myriapods are most abundant in moist forests, where they fulfill an important role in breaking down decaying plant material, although a few live in grasslands, semi-arid habitats or even deserts. A very small percentage of species are littoral (found along the sea shore).  The majority are detritivorous, with the exception of centipedes, which are chiefly nocturnal predators. A few species of centipedes and millipedes are able to produce light and are therefore bioluminescent  Pauropodans and symphylans are small, sometimes microscopic animals that resemble centipedes superficially and live in soils. Millipedes differ from the other groups in having their body segments fused into pairs, giving the appearance that each segment bears two pairs of legs, while the other three groups have a single pair of legs on each body segment.

Although not generally considered dangerous to humans, many millipedes produce noxious secretions (often containing benzoquinones) which in rare cases can cause temporary blistering and discolouration of the skin. Large centipedes, however, can bite humans, and although the bite may cause intense pain and discomfort, fatalities are extremely rare.

Classification
There has been much debate as to which arthropod group is most closely related to the Myriapoda. Under the Mandibulata hypothesis, Myriapoda is the sister taxon to Pancrustacea, a group comprising the Crustacea and Hexapoda (insects and their close relatives). Under the Atelocerata hypothesis, Hexapoda is the closest, whereas under the Paradoxopoda hypothesis, Chelicerata is the closest. This last hypothesis, although supported by few, if any, morphological characters, is supported by a number of molecular studies.
A 2020 study found numerous characters of the eye and preoral region suggesting that the closest relatives to crown myriapods are the extinct Euthycarcinoids. There are four classes of extant myriapods, Chilopoda (centipedes), Diplopoda, Pauropoda and Symphyla, containing a total of around 12,000 species. While each of these groups of myriapods is believed to be monophyletic, relationships among them are less certain.

Centipedes

Centipedes make up the class Chilopoda. They are fast, predatory and venomous, hunting mostly at night. There are around 3,300 species, ranging from the diminutive Nannarrup hoffmani (less than 12 mm or  in in length) to the giant Scolopendra gigantea, which may exceed .

Millipedes

Millipedes form the class Diplopoda. Most millipedes are slower than centipedes, and feed on leaf litter and detritus. Except for the first segment called collum, which don't have any appendages, and the next three segments with a single pair of legs each, they are distinguished by the fusion of each pair of body segments into a single unit, giving the appearance of having two pairs of legs per segment. It is also common for the sternites, pleurites and tergites to fuse into rigid armour rings. The males produce aflagellate sperm cells, unlike the rest of the myriapods which produce flagellated sperm. Around 12,000 species have been described, which may represent less than a tenth of the true global millipede diversity. Although the name "millipede" is a compound word formed from the Latin roots millia ("thousand") and pes (gen. pedis) ("foot"), millipedes typically have between 36 and 400 legs. In 2021, however, was described Eumillipes persephone, the first species known to have 1,000 or more legs, possessing 1,306 of them. Pill millipedes are much shorter, and are capable of rolling up into a ball, like pillbugs.

Symphyla
Symphylans, or garden centipedes, are closely related to centipedes and millipedes. They are 3 to 6 cm long, and have 6 to 12 pairs of legs, depending on their life stage. Their eggs, which are white and spherical and covered with small hexagonal ridges, are laid in batches of 4 to 25 at a time, and usually take up to 40 days to hatch. There are about 200 species worldwide.

Pauropoda

Pauropoda is another small group of small myriapods. They are typically 0.5–2.0 mm long and live in the soil on all continents except Antarctica. Over 700 species have been described. They are believed to be the sister group to millipedes, and have the dorsal tergites fused across pairs of segments, similar to the more complete fusion of segments seen in millipedes.

Arthropleuridea

Arthropleurideans were ancient myriapods that are now extinct, known from the late Silurian to the Permian. Arthropleuridea was historically considered a distinct class of myriapods, but since 2000 scientific consensus has viewed the group as a subset of millipedes, although the relationship of arthropleurideans to other millipedes and to each other is debated.

Myriapod relationships 

A variety of groupings (clades) of the myriapod classes have been proposed, some of which are mutually exclusive, and all of which represent hypotheses of evolutionary relationships. Traditional relationships supported by morphological similarities (anatomical or developmental similarities) are challenged by newer relationships supported by molecular evidence (including DNA sequence and amino acid similarities).

 Dignatha (also called Collifera) is a clade consisting of millipedes and pauropods, and is supported by morphological similarities including the presence of a gnathochilarium (a modified jaw and plate apparatus) and a collum, a legless segment behind the head. 
 Trignatha (also called Atelopoda) is a grouping of centipedes and symphylans, united by similarities of mouthparts.
 Edafopoda is a grouping of symphylans and pauropodans that is supported by shared genetic sequences, yet conflicts with Dignatha and Trignatha.
 Progoneata is a group encompassing millipedes, pauropods and symphylans while excluding centipedes. Shared features include reproductive openings (gonopores) behind the second body segment, and sensory hairs (trichobothria) with a bulb-like swelling. It is compatible with either Dignatha or Edafopoda.

See also 

 Euthycarcinoidea, a group of enigmatic arthropods that may be ancestral to myriapods
 Colonization of land, major evolutionary stages leading to terrestrial organisms
 Metamerism, the condition of multiple linearly repeated body segments

References

External links

 Myriapod Fossil Record - University of Bristol
 International Journal of Myriapodology
 International Society of Myriapodology
 British Myriapod and Isopod Group
 Myriapods, the World's Leggiest Animals - North America

 
Animal subphyla
Extant Silurian first appearances
Taxa named by Pierre André Latreille